Fride Mekong à Iroume (born ) is a Cameroonian female volleyball player. She is a member of the Cameroon women's national volleyball team and played for FAP Yaoundé in 2014. She was part of the Cameroonian national team at the 2014 FIVB Volleyball Women's World Championship in Italy.

Clubs
  FAP Yaoundé (2014)

References

1985 births
Living people
Cameroonian women's volleyball players
Place of birth missing (living people)
Liberos
21st-century Cameroonian women